Punta Negra is a small peninsula (punta) and a resort (balneario) in the Maldonado Department of Uruguay.

Location
The beach on its coast is called Playa Punta Negra.

Population
In 2011 Punta Negra had a population of 178 permanent inhabitants and 505 dwellings.
 
Source: Instituto Nacional de Estadística de Uruguay

References

External links
INE map of Piriápolis, Punta Colorada and Punta Negra

Populated places in the Maldonado Department
Headlands of Uruguay
Seaside resorts in Uruguay